Phylo is a genus of polychaetes belonging to the family Orbiniidae.

The genus has cosmopolitan distribution.

Species:

Phylo capensis 
Phylo felix 
Phylo fimbriata 
Phylo foetida 
Phylo grubei 
Phylo kubbarensis 
Phylo kupfferi 
Phylo kuwaitica 
Phylo norvegicus 
Phylo novazealandiae 
Phylo nudus 
Phylo ornatus 
Phylo paraornatus

References

Annelids